Malartic may refer to:

 Comte de Malartic, a French colonial governor and general in Canada and Mauritius. The Canadian city of Malartic is named after him.
 Malartic, Quebec, a town on the Malartic River in northwestern Quebec, Canada.
 Château Malartic-Lagravière